Asahel Collins Beckwith (1827–1896) was a senator from Wyoming.

Appointed by the governor to fill a vacancy in the term beginning March 4, 1893, caused by failure of the state legislature to elect him to office, Beckwith took his seat February 6, 1895. Beckwith presented credentials as a Senator-designate March 15, 1893 (special session of the Senate), but was not sworn pending investigation of his right to the seat. He resigned July 11, 1893, before final action was taken by the Senate. The seat was vacant from March 4, 1893, to January 22, 1895.

References
 Wyoming Biography Database
 makeup of the 53rd congress
 53rd congress of the united states

1827 births
1896 deaths
People from Mentor, Ohio
Wyoming Democrats